is a private university located near Koshien Stadium in Nishinomiya, Hyōgo, Japan, founded in 1939. It has an international branch campus in Spokane, Washington, USA: Mukogawa U.S. Campus.

History
 Feb 25, 1939 Educational Corporation Mukogawa Gakuin established by Kiichiro Koe
 Apr 1, 1939 Mukogawa Girls' High School founded
 Apr 1, 1946 Mukogawa Women's Academy founded
 Apr 1, 1947 Mukogawa Women's University junior High School founded
 Jun 12, 1947 Emperor Hirohito visits Mukogawa
 Apr 1, 1948 Mukogawa Women's University Senior High School founded
 Apr 1, 1950 Junior College Division established
 Oct 30, 1956 The Emperor and the Empress visit Mukogawa
 Apr 1, 1966 Graduate School Master's Course established
 Apr 30, 1967 Akira Kusaka appointed President of University and Junior College
 Apr 1, 1979 University Kindergarten established
 Sep 6, 1981 Founder Kiichiro Koe dies
 Sep 25, 1981 Akira Kusaka inaugurated as Chairman of the Board and Chancellor
 Apr 1, 1985 One-year graduate programs established
 Apr 1. 1989 Graduate School Doctor's Course established
 Jan 31, 1990 Mukogawa Fort Wright Institute established in Spokane, Washington U.S.A.
 Nov 6, 1999 Sixtieth anniversary celebrated
 Sep 1, 2001 Chairman of the Board, Chancellor and President Akira Kusaka dies
 Sep 2, 2001 Ryo Okawara inaugurated as Chairman of the Board and Chancellor
 Sep 2, 2001 Toshiharu Yamamoto appointed President of University and Junior College
 Apr 1, 2006 Junichi Kunitomo appointed President of University and Junior College

Departments

School of Letters
 Department of Japanese Language and Literature
 Department of English
 Department of Education
 Department of Health and Sports Sciences
 Department of Psychology and Social Welfare

School of Human Environmental Sciences
 Department of Human Environmental Sciences
 Department of Food Science and Nutrition
 Department of Informatics and Mediology
 Department of Architecture

School of Music
 Department of Performing Arts, School of Music
 Department of Applied Music, School of Music

School of Pharmacy and Pharmaceutical Sciences
 Department of Pharmacy
 Department of Health and Bio-pharmaceutical Sciences

Graduate Schools
 Graduate School of Human Environmental Sciences
 Graduate School of Pharmaceutical Sciences
 Graduate School of Clinical Education

Affliated Schools
Mukogawa Women's University Junior & Senior High School

References

External links 
 武庫川女子大学[Mukogawa Women's University] official site
 Mukogawa Women's University official English site
 Mukogawa Fort Wright Institute official English site
 Mukogawa Fort Wright Institute official Japanese site

Women's universities and colleges in Japan
Private universities and colleges in Japan
Educational institutions established in 1939
Universities and colleges in Hyōgo Prefecture
1939 establishments in Japan
Nishinomiya